Khulna is a village and a gram panchayat in Sandeshkhali II CD Block in Basirhat subdivision of North 24 Parganas district in the Indian state of West Bengal.

Geography 
Khulna is located at

Demographics 
As per the 2011 Census of India, Khulna had a total population of 5,958, of which 3,070 (52%) were males and 2,888 (48%) were females. Population below 6 years was 680. The total number of literates in Khulna was 4,093 (77.55% of the population over 6 years).

Transport

References 

Villages in North 24 Parganas district